Acrocercops hedymopa is a moth of the family Gracillariidae. It is known from Queensland, Australia, and Benin in West Africa.

References

hedymopa
Moths of Queensland
Moths of Africa
Moths described in 1913